Timo Becker (born 25 March 1997) is a German professional footballer who plays as a centre-back for  club Holstein Kiel.

Career
Becker made his professional debut for Schalke 04 in the Bundesliga on 29 November 2019, coming on as a substitute in the 90th minute in a 2–1 home win against Union Berlin. In January 2022, he joined Hansa Rostock on loan until the end of the season.

On 10 June 2022, Becker agreed to join Holstein Kiel, signing a three-year contract.

Career statistics

References

External links
 
 

1997 births
Living people
People from Herten
Sportspeople from Münster (region)
Footballers from North Rhine-Westphalia
German footballers
Association football defenders
Rot-Weiss Essen players
FC Schalke 04 II players
FC Schalke 04 players
FC Hansa Rostock players
Holstein Kiel players
Bundesliga players
2. Bundesliga players
Regionalliga players